Neodymium iodide may refer to:

 Neodymium(II) iodide (neodymium diiodide), NdI2
 Neodymium(III) iodide (neodymium triiodide), NdI3